The 1968 Miami Dolphins season was the team's third in the American Football League (AFL). The team improved on their 4–10 record from 1967, finishing the season 5–8–1 and moving one place up in the AFL Eastern Division. In week 6, the Dolphins tied the Buffalo Bills, 14–14, the first tie in franchise history. The Dolphins finished their season with a 5-8-1 record, a mild improvement from the previous season.

Offseason

Common draft

Personnel

Staff

Roster

Regular season

Schedule

Standings

References

External links
 1968 Miami Dolphins at Pro-Football-Reference.com

Miami Dolphins seasons
Miami Dolphins
Miami Dolphins